Clan Chisholm (pronounced /ˈtʃɪzəm/ ) (IPA:[ˈʃis̪əɫ̪]) is a Highland Scottish clan.

History

Origins
According to Alexander Mackenzie, the Clan Chisholm is of Norman and Saxon origin. Tradition stating that the Chisholms were a Norman family who arrived in England after the conquest of 1066., the original surname being De Chese to which the Saxon term "Holme" was added. According to the Collins Scottish Clan & Family Encyclopedia the Chisholm name was known in the Scottish Borders since the reign of Alexander III. In early records the name is written as "de Cheseholme", eventually later becoming Chisholm. In Scotland the earliest recorded person of the family is on the Ragman Rolls as "Richard de Chisholm del Counte de Rokesburgh", referring to the Clan Chisholm's seat in Roxburghshire.

One of the earliest recorded members of the family was John de Chesehelme, who in 1254 was mentioned in a bull of Pope Alexander IV.

Wars of Scottish Independence

In 1296 Richard de Chesehelme rendered homage to Edward I of England and appears on the Ragman Rolls.

Sir John de Chesholme led the clan at the Battle of Bannockburn in 1314 against the English. Robert Chisholm fought against the English at the Battle of Neville's Cross in 1346, was taken prisoner with King David II and probably not released until eleven years later when his royal master returned to Scotland. In 1359 after being knighted by the king he succeeded his grandfather as Constable of Urquhart Castle, and later became Sheriff of Inverness and Justiciar of the North. This Robert was the last Chisholm to hold lands in both the North and South of Scotland. He divided his estates among his younger children.

Robert's son was Alexander Chisholm who married Margaret, heiress of the lands of Erchless. Erchless Castle has been the seat of the chiefs ever since.

Conflicts

The Chisholms became well known for cattle raiding. In 1498 Wiland Chisholm of Comar and others carried off 56 oxen, 60 cows, 300 sheep, 80 swine and 15 horses belonging to Hugh Rose of the Clan Rose.

In 1513, Wiland Chisholm of Comar and Sir Alexander MacDonell of Glengarry were with Sir Donald MacDonald of Lochalsh on his return from the Battle of Flodden when he decided to attack the Urquhart Castle. Some sources say that Macdonald occupied the castle for three years despite the efforts of the Clan Grant to dislodge him and his companions.

Civil War

In 1647, Alexander Chisholm was appointed to the committee which arranged the defence of Inverness on behalf of the Covenanters against the Royalists. In 1653 the Chisholms stole cattle from the clans Munro and Fraser, they were however captured and brought to court where they were ordered to return all they had stolen and pay the Chief Munro of Foulis and Chief Fraser of Lovat £1000 interest each.

After the Stuart restoration in 1660, Alexander followed his father as a justice of the peace, and in 1674 was appointed Sheriff Deputy for Inverness. Once again his duties brought him up against the MacDonalds, for in 1679 he was ordered to lead a thousand men of the county to quell a disturbance created by some members of said clan, and in 1681 he was given a commission of fire and sword against them.

Jacobite risings
During the Jacobite rising of 1715, Roderick Maciain Chisholm, supported the Jacobite cause. Chisholm of Crocfin led two hundred clansmen at the Battle of Sherrifmuir in 1715 where they were defeated. Some members of the clan took part in the Jacobite rising of 1719. A landing was made on the west of Scotland, and according to one account, the Chisholms were employed as scouts. They were not present at the Battle of Glen Shiel, which ended that Jacobite rebellion. Much of Roderick's lands were afterwards forfeited to the Crown. With a number of other chiefs, Roderick obtained a royal pardon in 1727, but he was never allowed to regain his estates, which his brother administered until 1743, when it was transferred to Roderick's eldest son, Alexander Chisholm, younger of Comar.
General Wade's report on the Highlands in 1724, estimated the clan strength at 150 men. During the Jacobite rising of 1745, Roderick again supported the Jacobites. His youngest son, Roderick Og Chisholm led the clan at the Battle of Culloden, leading a very small regiment of about 80 clansmen, of which 30 were killed, including himself. One of the 14 Jacobite battle flags taken at Culloden, which were later burnt in Edinburgh, was a white linen banner of this regiment.

Two of Roderick's other sons James and John were Captains in the British army under the Duke of Cumberland.

Clan seat

The seat of Clan Chisholm was originally at Comar Lodge and then at Erchless Castle, which was sold in 1937.

Clan Chiefs

The present chief is Andrew Francis Hamish Chisholm of that Ilk, thirty-third Chief of Clan Chisholm.

The following is a list of some of the previous chiefs of Clan Chisholm.

See also

Carn Eige, Mam Sodhail and Glen Affric, parts of the former Highland Chisholm lands.
Chisholm (disambiguation)

External links
Clan Chisholm Society
Clan Chisholm links
Chisholm Heraldry

References
Notes

Bibliography

 
Boars in heraldry